Rubén Cantú is a corregimiento in Santa Fé District, Veraguas Province, Panama with a population of 1,160 as of 2010. It was created by Law 37 of June 24, 2008.

References

Corregimientos of Veraguas Province